= Habita =

Portuguese NGO

Habita! Associação pelo direito à habitação e à cidade is a Portuguese non-governmental organization (NGO) founded in 2013 that advocates for housing rights and urban justice. Established by activists from previous social movements, the association operates primarily in Lisbon and other major Portuguese cities.

The association's focuses its activity on the promotion of the right to housing, and advocates for housing as a social right rather than a market commodity. In alignment with this mission, it campaigns against real estate speculation, especially in Lisbon and other large Portuguese cities, in the context of the housing market situation in Portugal. Furthermore, it provides direct support to individuals and communities affected by homelessness or eviction proceedings.

Regarding its activities against evictions, the entity intervenes in cases, primarily within the metropolitan area of Lisbon. Actions include, for instance, requesting the suspension of evictions in social housing in the capital, and working to maintain legal frameworks that prevent the eviction of vulnerable families.

Habita! criticizes publicly effectiveness of government policies in the field of housing, and has maintained a critical stance towards government policies towards the State and the Portuguese Government, which they have publicly accused of "pretending to resolve the housing crisis" and for maintaining measures that they argue do not address speculation and the financialization of the sector. They also present proposals by regularly sending letters and manifestos to political representatives, requesting measures they deem "urgent and immediate" to resolve the crisis, which they link to the pressure from the tourism and real estate markets.

The fields of research and international relations constitute a further area of the entity's activity, and it participates in the housing movement alongside organizations from different countries, and contributes to the investigation of urban problems, analysing the impact of urban regeneration policies and the dynamics of gentrification in Lisbon.

Habita! is a member of the European Action Coalition for the Right to Housing and to the City (EAC), thereby connecting the Portuguese movement with European initiatives that advocate against the commodification of housing. The work of Habita! has been subject to academic analysis as an example of collective resistance and social articulation in the cities of Southern Europe.
